La Sierra High School, located in Riverside, California, United States, is a public high school in the Alvord Unified School District that was founded on August 28, 1969. Tania Cabeza is the principal. La Sierra High School's official school colors are navy blue and white. Red is the accent color and has been since the school opened.

The two main feeder schools for La Sierra High are Arizona and Villegas intermediate schools. La Sierra's rivals are Norte Vista and Hillcrest, the other public high schools in Alvord Unified.

Recent events
In 2005, La Sierra High School was awarded a 6-year clear accreditation through the Western Association of Schools and Colleges, making it the first comprehensive high school in the entire Inland Empire to earn this distinction.

In the 2007–2008 school year, approximately 3,200 students attended La Sierra High.

Hillcrest High School opened in fall 2012 to relieve crowding at La Sierra.

Academics and test scores

Test scores

API
In 2005, La Sierra High School increased its API (Academic Performance Index (California public schools)) to 715 from the 2004 base score of 679. Although it met the school-wide growth target, it did not meet the state subgroup growth targets. To encourage schools to improve achievement for all students, the state computes APIs and sets improvement targets for the different student subgroups at the school.

CST results
In 2005, La Sierra's students met or exceeded the state expectations on the California Standardized Testing and Reporting (STAR) as listed below:

CAHSEE results
All data below reflect the percentage of sophomore, junior and senior students who passed the CAHSEE sections.

Athletics
La Sierra is a member of the California Interscholastic Federation (CIF) River Valley League along with Hillcrest, Jurupa Valley, Norte Vista, Patriot and Ramona high schools. They won the boys' state team track title in June 2009 which was the first boys' team track title in Riverside County history.

Teachers

According to the California Department of Education, in the 2005–2006 school year, teachers at La Sierra had 11.1 years average teaching experience and had spent an average of 10 years teaching in the Alvord Unified School District. The average class size was ~ 34.

Notable alumni
 Rizwan Farook, Islamic terrorist who was one of the perpetrators of the 2015 San Bernardino attack in which 14 people were murdered
 Jesse James, founder of West Coast Choppers 1983-1987
 Mitch Lucker, lead vocalist for the deathcore band Suicide Silence
 Mark Takano - first non white LGBT member of Congress
 Tyree Washington, athlete (track and field)
 Reggie Wyatt, National High School record holder in the 300 hurdles

References

External links

 La Sierra High School website

Educational institutions established in 1969
High schools in Riverside, California
Public high schools in California
1969 establishments in California